Yang Yang (born 1953) is a Chinese-born American contemporary artist and sculptor. He creates figurative paintings and sculptures of unconventional forms. Lui Qi Wei, curator of the Museum of Fine Art in Shaanxi, describes Yang Yang's work as combining the quality of the "Oriental mystics with tragic magnificence." The medium of Yang Yang's works range from works on paper and canvas to sculptural works in fiberglass, ceramic or bronze. Yang Yang's works are internationally recognized and collected. His exhibitions include the Museum or Fine Art in Shaanxi China, the Minneapolis Institute of Art, and Gallery 456 of the Chinese-American Arts Council. Yang Yang currently resides in the United States.

Notes

External links
Biography of Yang Yang (includes a portrait of the artist)

Living people
1953 births